Hillforts are fortified settlements that were built across Europe in the Bronze Age, Iron Age, and, to a lesser extent, the Early Middle Ages. The following pages are lists of hillforts:
Great Britain
 List of hillforts in Wales
 List of hillforts in Monmouthshire
 List of hillforts on the Isle of Man
 List of hillforts in Northern Ireland
 List of hillforts in Scotland
 List of hillforts in England
List of hillforts in the Peak District
 List of hillforts and ancient settlements in Somerset
Other
 contains a common list of castles, fortresses, forts, an hillforts.
 List of hillforts in Ireland
 List of hillforts in Latvia
 List of hillforts in Lithuania